The Upper Trajan's Wall is the modern name given to a fortification located in the central area of modern Moldavia. Some scholars consider it to be of Roman origin, while others think it was built in the third/fourth century by the Germanic Greuthungi to defend their borders against the Huns. It may also have been called Greuthungian Wall in later Roman accounts, but this is uncertain owing to a single polysemic manuscript occurrence in the works of Ammianus Marcellinus.

Characteristics

The wall stretches 120 kilometres from the Dniester River in the Teleneşti district to the Prut River. In Romania the remains of the wall can be found in Tiganasi, Carniceni, Sendreni and Tocsomeni.

Some scholars, such as Vasile Nedelciuc, argue that the turf Wall was built initially by the Romans, owing to the fact that it has a ditch facing north, away from Roman territory. Under this hypothesis Emperor Trajan made the first construction of the turf wall around 110 AD, in order to protect the coastal area from the Danube delta as far as Tyras.

Others, such as the historian Peter Heather, affirm it was built by the local Germanic tribes, mainly as a defense against raiders from Central Asia (Attila's Huns). Historian Thomas S. Burns is more reluctant, and wishes for better dating data. The identification of the geographical feature in Moldavia with the passage in Ammianus Marcellinus has been proposed by the Romanian historian Radu Vulpe in 1957. Historian Herwig Wolfram questions the emendation given to the passage in Ammianus Marcellinus necessary to read it as being about a wall.

See also

 Trajan's Wall 
 Southern Trajan's Wall (in Bessarabia) 
 History of Moldova

References

Further reading 
 Emanuel Constantin Antoche, Marcel Tanasache, (1990) "Le Vallum (Troian) de la Moldavie centrale" in Etudes Roumaines et Aroumaines. Sociétés européennes, no. 8, Paris ; Bucharest : [s.n], pp. 130–133, ; Sudoc 087572664

External links
 Roman castra and walls from Romania/Moldovia - Google Maps / Earth
 Video of Roman Walls in Moldova (in Moldovan)

Roman fortifications in Moldova
Goths
Germanic archaeology
Ancient history of Romania
Roman Dacia
Roman walls in Romania
Roman frontiers